The 2009 Bancolombia Open was a professional tennis tournament played on outdoor red clay courts. It was part of the 2009 ATP Challenger Tour. It took place in Bogotá, Colombia between 16 and 22 March 2009.

Singles entrants

Seeds

Rankings are as of March 9, 2009.

Other entrants
The following players received wildcards into the singles main draw:
  Juan Sebastián Cabal
  Alejandro González
  Michael Quintero
  Carlos Salamanca

The following players received entry from the qualifying draw:
  Juan Pablo Amado
  Diego Álvarez
  Marcel Felder
  Riccardo Ghedin

Champions

Men's singles

 Horacio Zeballos def.  Santiago González, 7–6(3), 6–0

Men's doubles

 Sebastián Prieto /  Horacio Zeballos def.  Alexander Peya /  Fernando Vicente, 4–6, 6–1, [11–9]

External links
ITF search 

Bancolombia Open
Bancolombia Open
2009 in Colombian tennis